Sandra Jenkins (born July 20, 1961 in Fort Saskatchewan, Alberta as Sandra Rippel) is a Canadian curler from Salmon Arm, British Columbia.

Jenkins was the alternate player for the Canadian women's team at the 2006 Winter Olympics skipped by Shannon Kleibrink. Sandra got to play in a few games as some of the members of the team had been ill.

Jenkins played second for Cathy Shaw at the 1982 and 1983 Scott Tournament of Hearts. The team lost in the final in 1983 to Penny LaRocque of Nova Scotia. In 1987 Jenkins was the third for Ken Ursuliak at the Canadian Mixed Curling Championship. Also in 1987 she was in the Olympic Trials playing for Marilyn Darte. She returned to the Scotts in 1989 as an alternate for Debbie Shermack.

In 1993 she joined up with Shannon Kleibrink as her third at that year's Scott Tournament of Hearts. She would not play with Kleibrink again until the 2005 Canadian Olympic Trials. In 2002 Jenkins was the lead for Ken Hunka at the Mixed.

Jenkins currently skips her own team.

External links
 
 Sandra Jenkins on Real Champions

1961 births
Living people
Canadian women curlers
Curlers at the 2006 Winter Olympics
Curlers from Alberta
Curlers from British Columbia
People from Salmon Arm
People from Fort Saskatchewan
Olympic bronze medalists for Canada
Olympic curlers of Canada
Olympic medalists in curling
Medalists at the 2006 Winter Olympics